98.3 One FM (DZLQ 98.3 MHz) is an FM radio station owned and operated by Radio Corporation of the Philippines. Its studios and transmitter are located at DZLT Compound, Brgy. Ibabang Dapay, Lucena City. It is one of the One FM stations affiliated with the Radio Mindanao Network.

References

External links
One FM FB Page
One FM Lucena FB Page

Radio stations in Lucena, Philippines
Radio stations established in 1977